Horst Herrlich (11 September 1937, in Berlin – 13 March 2015, in Bremen) was a German mathematician, known as a pioneer of categorical topology.

Education and career
Horst Herrlich received his PhD in 1962 with thesis Ordnungsfähigkeit topologischer Räume (Orderability of topological spaces) under Karl Peter Grotemeyer and Alexander Dinghas at the Free University of Berlin, where he also received his habilitation in 1965 with a thesis on E-compact spaces (introduced by Stanisław Mrówka in 1958).

From 1971 to 2002 Herrlich was a professor of mathematics with a focus on general topology and category theory at the University of Bremen. He was part of the editorial staff for the third volume Deskriptive Mengenlehre und Topologie of the collected works of Felix Hausdorff.

He was an Invited Speaker of the International Congress of Mathematicians in 1974 in Vancouver. He is regarded as a founder of categorical topology, which deals with general topology using the methods of category theory.

Selected publications
 
 with George E. Strecker: 
 
 
 
 with Jiří Adámek and George E. Strecker:

References

20th-century German mathematicians
21st-century German mathematicians
Free University of Berlin alumni
Academic staff of the University of Bremen
1937 births
2015 deaths